In South African rugby union in 2006, the First Division Currie Cup competition was won by the , who beat the  37–13 in the final on 6 October 2006.

Results

October 2006
06-Oct-06	Impala Leopards	13 - 37	Fidentia Boland Kavaliers	Olén Park

September 2006
30-Sep-06	Fidentia Boland Kavaliers	38 - 27	Eagles	Boland Stadium
29-Sep-06	Impala Leopards	63 - 13	Mighty Elephants	Olén Park
23-Sep-06	Impala Leopards	35 - 26	Border Bulldogs	Olén Park
22-Sep-06	Mighty Elephants	17 - 36	Eagles	EPRFU Stadium
22-Sep-06	Griffons	37 - 27	Fidentia Boland Kavaliers	North West Stadium
16-Sep-06	Eagles	25-Oct	Griffons	Outeniqua Park
15-Sep-06	Border Bulldogs	36 - 57	Mighty Elephants	ABSA Stadium - EL
08-Sep-06	Mighty Elephants	21 - 26	Impala Leopards	EPRFU Stadium
08-Sep-06	Griffons	13 - 23	Border Bulldogs	North West Stadium
08-Sep-06	Fidentia Boland Kavaliers	45 - 15	Eagles	Boland Stadium
01-Sep-06	Border Bulldogs	16 - 38	Fidentia Boland Kavaliers	ABSA Stadium - EL
01-Sep-06	Griffons	29-Oct	Impala Leopards	North West Stadium

August 2006
25-Aug-06	Eagles	30 - 28	Border Bulldogs	Outeniqua Park
25-Aug 06 	Griffons	28 - 17	Mighty Elephants	North West Stadium
25-Aug-06	Fidentia Boland Kavaliers	27 - 24	Impala Leopards	Boland Stadium
19-Aug-06	Impala Leopards	40 - 33	Eagles	Olén Park
19-Aug-06	Mighty Elephants	12-May	Fidentia Boland Kavaliers	EPRFU Stadium
09-Aug-06	Eagles	Aug-47	Mighty Elephants	Outeniqua Park
05-Aug-06	Fidentia Boland Kavaliers	59 - 0	Griffons	Boland Stadium
04-Aug-06	Border Bulldogs	19 - 30	Impala Leopards	ABSA Stadium - EL

July 2006
29-Jul-06	Griffons	33 - 36	Eagles	North West Stadium
28-Jul-06	Mighty Elephants	40 - 32	Border Bulldogs	EPRFU Stadium
22-Jul-06	Impala Leopards	39 - 37	Mighty Elephants	Fanie du Toit Sports Grounds
22-Jul-06	Eagles	17 - 38	Fidentia Boland Kavaliers	Outeniqua Park
21-Jul-06	Border Bulldogs	30-Oct	Griffons	ABSA Stadium - EL
15-Jul-06	Griffons	15 - 59	Impala Leopards	Fanie du Toit Sports Grounds
15-Jul-06	Fidentia Boland Kavaliers	Sep-41	Border Bulldogs	Boland Stadium
08-Jul-06	Impala Leopards	22 - 22	Fidentia Boland Kavaliers	Olén Park
08-Jul-06	Mighty Elephants	31 - 26	Griffons	EPRFU Stadium
07-Jul-06	Border Bulldogs	13 - 19	Eagles	ABSA Stadium - EL
01-Jul-06	Fidentia Boland Kavaliers	46 - 14	Mighty Elephants	Boland Stadium
01-Jul-06	Eagles	5 - 48	Impala Leopards	Outeniqua Park

References

Source: 

2006
2006 Currie Cup